This list covers television programs whose first letter (excluding "the") of the title is D.

D

DA

The D.A. (1971)
The D.A. (2004)
Da Ali G Show
Da Boom Crew
Da Jammies
Da Vinci's Demons
Da Vinci's Inquest
Dad's Army
The Daily 10
The Daily Buzz
Daily Planet
Daily Pop
The Daily Show (Ireland)
The Daily Show (US)
Daisy of Love
Daitetsujin 17
Daktari
Dallas (1978)
Dallas (2012)
Dallas Cowboys Cheerleaders: Making the Team
The Daltons
Damages
Damnation
Dan August
Dan Raven
Dance Academy
Dance Moms
Dance Moms: Miami
Dance Mums with Jennifer Ellison (UK)
Dance on Sunset
Dance War: Bruno vs. Carrie Ann
DanceX (UK)
Dance Your Ass Off
Dancin' to the Hits
Dancing on Ice (UK)
Dancing with the Stars
Dancing with the Stars (US)
Dancing with the Stars: Juniors
Danger 5
Danger Force
Danger Island
Danger Man
Danger Mouse
Dani's Castle
Dani's House
Daniel Tiger's Neighborhood
Danny Phantom
Dan Vs.
Darcy's Wild Life
Daredevil
Daria
Dark
Dark Angel (2000, U.S.)
Dark Angel (2016, UK)
Dark Blue
Darker than Black
Dark Matter (Canada)
Dark Matters: Twisted But True 
Darknet (Canada)
Dark Net (US)
Dark Oracle
Dark Shadows
Dark Shadows (1991)
Darkwing Duck
Dash Dolls
Date My Ex: Jo & Slade
Dateline (Australia)
Dateline NBC
The Dating Game
The Dating Guy
Dating Naked
Dave Allen
Dave The Barbarian 
The David Letterman Show
David Tutera's CELEBrations
The DaVincibles
Dawn of the Croods
Dawson's Creek
Day Break
The Day My Butt Went Psycho!
The Days and Nights of Molly Dodd
Days Like These (UK)
Days of Our Lives
DaySide

DC
DC Super Hero Girls
DC Super Friends

DE

Dead Gorgeous
Dead of Night (UK)
Dead of Summer
Deadliest Catch
Deadliest Warrior
Dead Like Me
  Dead to Me 
Deadly Women
Deadly Class
The Dead Zone
Deadwood
Deal or No Deal
The Dean Martin Celebrity Roast 
The Dean Martin Show
Dear Phoebe
Dear Sister
Death Battle! (Web series)
Death in Paradise
Death Note
Debatable (BBC)
The Debbie Reynolds Show
Debra!
Decisiones
Decker
Deep State
The Defenders
Defiance
Defying Gravity
Degrassi High (Canada)
Degrassi Junior High (Canada)
Degrassi: Next Class (Canada)
Degrassi: The Next Generation (Canada)
Deion's Family Playbook
Delilah & Julius
Deliver Me
Delocated
Deltora Quest
Demons
Denise Richards: It's Complicated
Denkigai no Honya-san
Dennis and Gnasher (Canada/UK)
Dennis & Gnasher: Unleashed! (UK)
Dennis the Menace (1959)
Dennis the Menace (1986)
Dennis the Menace and Gnasher (Australia/UK)
Department S
Derry Girls (UK)
Descendants: Wicked World
Desert Punk
Designated Survivor
Designed to Sell
Designing Women
Desperate Housewives
Destroy Build Destroy
Desus & Mero (2016)
Desus & Mero (2019)
Detention (US)
Detention (Taiwan)
Detentionaire
The Devil Is a Part-Timer!
Devious Maids
Dexter
Dexter's Laboratory

DH

Dharma & Greg

DI

Diagnosis: Murder
Diana
Diary of a Future President
The Dick Van Dyke Show
Different Strokes
A Different World
Di-Gata Defenders
Digby Dragon
Digimon
Dilbert
Diners, Drive-Ins and Dives
Dinner: Impossible
Dinosaucers
Dinosaur King
Dinosaur Train
Dinosaurs
DinoSquad
Dinotrux
Dirt
Dirtgirlworld
Dirty Jobs
Dirty John
Dirty Sally
Dirty Sexy Money
Dirty Soap
Discovery of Love (South Korea)
Disenchantment
Disjointed
Disney's Adventures of the Gummi Bears
Disney's Fairy Tale Weddings
Distraction (UK game show)
Divided (UK)
Divided (US)
Divine Design
Divorce
The Divorce (Australia) 
Dixon of Dock Green

DN
D.N. Ace

DO

Do Over
Doc Elliot
Doc Martin
Doc McStuffins
Doctors (UK)
The Doctors (US soap opera)
The Doctors (US talk show)
Doctor Snuggles
Doctor Stranger (South Korea)
Doctor Who (UK)
Dodger, Bonzo and the Rest
Dog and Beth: On the Hunt
Dog with a Blog
Dog the Bounty Hunter
Dog Bites Man
Dog Eat Dog
Dog Whisperer with Cesar Millan 
Dogs 
Doki 
Dollhouse
Doña Bárbara (Columbia)
Donkey Kong Country
The Donna Dewberry Show
The Donna Reed Show
Donnie Loves Jenny
Donny & Marie
Don't
Don't Be Tardy
Don't Call Me Charlie!
Don't Forget the Lyrics!
Don't Forget the Lyrics! (UK)
Don't Forget the Lyrics! (US)
Don't Forget Your Toothbrush
Don't Tell the Bride (UK)
Don't Trust the B---- in Apartment 23
Don't Wait Up
The Doodlebops
Doodlebops Rockin' Road Show
Doogie Howser, M.D.
Doom Patrol
Doomwatch
The Doozers
Doraemon
Doraemon: Gadget Cat from the Future
Dora the Explorer
Dora and Friends: Into the City!
Dorothy and the Wizard of Oz
Dot.
Double Dare (CBS)
Double Dare (Nickelodeon)
Double Take (2009) (Australia)
Double Take (2018) (US)
Double Trouble (U.S.)
Doug
Douglas Family Gold
The Downer Channel
Downton Abbey
Downward Dog

DR

Dr. 90210
Dr. Dimensionpants
Dr. Finlay's Casebook
Dr. Katz, Professional Therapist
Dr. Ken
Dr. Kildare
The Dr. Laura Berman Show
The Dr. Oz Show
Dr. Phil
Dr. Pimple Popper
Dr. Quinn, Medicine Woman
Dr. Shrinker
Dr. Steve-O
Dragnet
Dragon
Dragon Ball
Dragon Ball GT
Dragon Ball Kai
Dragon Ball Super
Dragon Ball Z
Dragon Flyz
Dragon Tales
DragonflyTV
Dragons' Den 
Dragons' Den (UK)
Drake & Josh
Drama Club
Drawn Together
DreamWorks Dragons
The Dresden Files
The Drew Carey Show
Drew and Shannon Live (New Zealand)
Drive
Drama Club
Drop Dead Diva
Drop the Mic
Drunk History (UK)
Drunk History (US)

DU

Duck Dodgers
Duck Dynasty
The Duck Factory
Duckman
DuckTales (1987)
DuckTales (2017)
The Dude Perfect Show
Dude, That's My Ghost!
Dude, What Would Happen
Dudley The Dragon
Dudley Do-Right
Due South
Duncanville
Dungeons & Dragons
The Dukes of Hazzard
Dusty's Trail

DY

Dynasty (Australia)
Dynasty (1981) (US)
Dynasty (2017) (US)
Dynomutt, Dog Wonder

Previous:  List of television programs: C    Next:  List of television programs: E